Harlem Is Heaven is a 1932 American pre-Code crime drama and musical film directed by Irwin Franklyn and featuring a virtually all African-American cast. Bill "Bojangles" Robinson stars in his first leading role on screen, along with Putney Dandridge, John Mason, and some of the top entertainers of the period from Harlem's famous Cotton Club, including James Baskett, Anise Boyer, Henri Wessell, and Alma Smith. Eubie Blake and his orchestra perform most of the background music and instrumentals during the film's onstage song and dance numbers.

"The Tree of Hope"
Preceding the opening scene of Harlem Is Heaven is a contemporary montage of residents walking and parading on the streets of Harlem, moving images that are accompanied on the screen by a scrolling prologue. Part of that introductory text provides the viewer with a brief history of a special tree in Harlem, an elm that in 1932 still grew next to one of the neighborhood's busy sidewalks:

Plot

One evening on a sidewalk in Harlem, Jean Stratton (Anise Boyer)—a young unemployed actress and dancer from West Virginia—stands next to "The Tree of Hope", openly praying and imploring the legendary tree to help find her work. When she stops one passing men to ask how long she needs to stand under the tree to get a job, a nearby police officer thinks she is a soliciting prostitute, so he arrests her. A group of spectators gather around the officer and Jean, including "Money" Johnson (James Baskett), who gets the officer to release  her. Money is a local theater owner widely known in Harlem. He is also a rackateer who specializes in "policy games" or gambling, as well as circulating phony investment schemes around New York, Philadelphia, and in other cities. After the officer and others leave, Money offers Jean a job at his Acme Theatre, gives her some cash as an advance on her salary, and tells her to report to his office the following day.

After meeting with Jean at his theater the next day, Money introduces her to Bill (Bill Robinson), Acme's star performer and director of its dance and other stage productions. At rehearsal Jean also meets another performer, a handsome young actor and dancer named "Chummy" Walker (Henri Wessell). Both Chummy and Bill are immediately smitten with Jean even though she initially refers to them as her protective "big brothers". Money, however, has his own plans to seduce her. Following another rehearsal, Money warns Chummy that "Miss Stratton" is more than his protégée, declaring "she's my personal and private property". He then orders Chummy to invite Jean to a party in his office after that evening's show. The party will actually be an intimate dinner with just Money. Chummy warns Jean of Money's intentions, but she ignores him and goes to the office, where the theater boss forces himself on her. As she struggles to leave, Bill enters the office, a fight ensues, and Bill knocks out Money. The next day Bill and Jean learn they have been fired.

Bill quickly gets a new job performing at a nearby nightclub owned by Knobs Moran (Bob Sawyer), Money's bitter rival in both entertainment and crime. Money now seeks revenge, especially against Chummy for divulging his wanton plan to take advantage of Jean. Money therefore hatches another plan, one to get Chummy imprisoned. He enlists him as the front man in marketing a bogus new hair-straightening product. Money arranges the scam so he is not openly involved, while assuring Chummy that the new product is genuine and will earn huge profits for everyone. Initially successful selling the product, Chummy is soon arrested and jailed for fraud after all the investors lose their money, including Bill's close friend John "Spider" Mason, who had committed most of his life savings to the enterprise.

 While visiting the police station to see Chummy, Jean learns of Money's role in devising the fraud, so she visits Greta (Alma Smith), one of Money's girlfriends who knows details about the scheme. After a brutal fight with Greta, Jean forces her to provide the district attorney with information proving Money's guilt, which results in Chummy's release from jail. Spider then learns from newspaper reports that it was Money, not Chummy, who had concocted the phony investment. Now seeking his own revenge for the loss of his money, Spider confronts Money in his office. After Money tries to shoot him, Spider uses a razor to kill the crime boss as he pleads for mercy. The story then ends in Bill's apartment, where Bill, his mother visiting from Richmond, Jean, and Chummy have gathered. Earlier, Bill had realized that Jean and Chummy had fallen in love, so he urges them to get married before he cheerfully leaves the apartment to see another friend.

Cast

Bill Robinson — Himself
John Mason — "Spider" Mason
Putney Dandridge — Stage Manager
Jimmy Baskette — Remus A. "Money" Johnson
Anise Boyer — Jean Stratton
Henri Wessell — "Chummy" Walker
Alma Smith — Greta Rae
Bob Sawyer — "Knobs" Moran
Eubie Blake — Himself (and his orchestra)
Juano Hernandez — Street Cop (uncredited)

Production notes
Before its release in 1932, the film was issued a tentative review certification number—02816—by the Motion Picture Producers and Distributors of America "pending the production company's adherence to the Hays Office's demands regarding specific changes in the script."
The title card in the film's opening credits notes a 1932 copyright for the production; however, both the American Film Institute (AFI) and Turner Classic Movies (TCM) state that "no indication of the film's registration for copyright has been found."
In the film's opening credits, "'The Cotton Club', Harlem" is also acknowledged for permitting "By Special Arrangement" the participation of "Jimmy Baskette", Anise Boyer, Henri Wessell, Alma Smith, and Bob Sawyer in the production.
With a budget reportedly under $50,000, Harlem Is Heaven was filmed in just one week at the Ideal Studios in Hudson Heights, New Jersey, and on location at the stages of several theaters, including the Ideal Theater in Philadelphia and the R.K.O. Kenmore Theater in Brooklyn.
African-American actors, dancers, musicians, and supporting players comprise nearly the film's entire cast, although there is an uncredited white actor with a speaking part, who portrays a district attorney. There are also white extras portraying peripheral characters, including an assistant to the district attorney and an attending officer at a police station.
During its production, the film was identified by the alternate or working title Harlem Rhapsody.
The film's romance-and-crime storyline is interwoven with solo tap-dance and singing performances by Bill Robinson, as well as chorus line productions and other group stage acts in rehearsals. During one scene in a neighborhood bar, Robinson sings a rendition of "Is You Is or Is You Ain't". Accompanying him at the piano and reciting lyrics in the "speak set" is jazz pianist and vocalist Putney Dandridge, although in its 1932 review of the film Variety misidentifies Dandridge as Eubie Blake.
Bill Robinson, who was 54 years old when the film was released, demonstrates his remarkable talents and agility as a dancer, especially in one solo number. Tap dancing to the tune of "Swanee River", he playfully and repeatedly moves up and down a set of portable prop stairs. Later, in 1935, he would perform a simplified version of this famous "stair step" routine with child star Shirley Temple in the MGM production The Little Colonel.
The film also marks James Baskett's screen debut as an actor, featuring him as the character "Remus A. Johnson". Fourteen years after his work on this production, Baskett would receive national fame for his portrayal of the controversial character "Uncle Remus" in Walt Disney's 1946 live-action animated musical film Song of the South.

Reception
In 1932, according to the widely read New York-based trade paper Variety, the film made over $4,000 during its opening week at just the Renaissance Theater in Harlem. That financial success led to its run being extended there. Variety in its June 7 edition also provides a lengthy assessment of the production. In its review the paper recommends the film's presentation to both white and black audiences, recognizes the drawing power of Bill Robinson at the box office, and finds Robinson and Baskett's performances to be the strongest elements of the quickly made, low-budget production:

In a more recent assessment of the film, in 2011, The World Cinema Review pans its storyline and acting but extols the dance and musical performances, especially those by Robinson:

References and notes

External links
 
 
 
 
 

1932 drama films